The Medieval Park is located in the borough of Gamle Oslo in Oslo, Norway. The park was opened in the year 2000 at Sørenga  in what was once the southern part of the medieval city of Oslo. The park is located within an area which also included the Minneparken and Ladegården on the north side of Bispegata. Development in the area is prohibited due to ruins and cultural layers above and below ground.

In the park are the ruins of St. Clement's Church, St. Mary's Church and the former royal estate (Oslo Kongsgård).  In the west the shore line meets the park's land area approximately where Oslofjord met Oslo during the Middle Ages (about year 1300).
 The part of the park located at the lake is 43 acres in addition to the water on 22 acres. Park facility at the ruins of St. Clement's Church are also considered for the park and this area is 4.7 acres, of the park that total is 70 acres.

Oslo Middelalderfestival and Øyafestivalen were annual events located in the park. From 2014, the event was moved to Tøyenparken. In 2014, Oslo Middelalderfestival was located at Akershus Castle.

See also
Minneparken

References 

Parks in Oslo
Archaeological sites in Norway
Oslo Old Town